The Miami University Voice of America Learning Center (Miami VOALC) is a satellite campus of Miami University in West Chester, Ohio. It is one of three regional campuses of Miami University. It is located on a portion of the former Voice of America Bethany Relay Station. Classes began in January 2009.

Academic Provision
Miami VOALC offers the same degree programs and classes as Miami Middletown and Miami Hamilton. Miami VOALC also hosts Miami's MBA program.

Miami University system
 Miami University, Oxford, Ohio (main campus)
 Miami University Hamilton, Hamilton, Ohio
 Miami University Middletown, Middletown, Ohio
 Miami University Dolibois European Center, Luxembourg
 Miami University Voice of America Learning Center, West Chester, Ohio

References

External links
Official website

Miami University
Public universities and colleges in Ohio
Educational institutions established in 2009
Buildings and structures in Butler County, Ohio
Education in Butler County, Ohio
2009 establishments in Ohio
Voice of America